In particle physics and physical cosmology, Planck units are a set of units of measurement defined exclusively in terms of four universal physical constants, in such a manner that these physical constants take on the numerical value of 1 when expressed in terms of these units. Originally proposed in 1899 by German physicist Max Planck, these units are a system of natural units because their definition is based on properties of nature, more specifically the properties of free space, rather than a choice of prototype object. They are relevant in research on unified theories such as quantum gravity.

The term Planck scale refers to quantities of space, time, energy and other units that are similar in magnitude to corresponding Planck units. At the Planck scale, the predictions of the Standard Model, quantum field theory and general relativity are not expected to apply, and quantum effects of gravity are expected to dominate. The best-known example is represented by the conditions in the first 10−43 seconds of our universe after the Big Bang, approximately 13.8 billion years ago.

The four universal constants that, by definition, have a numeric value 1 when expressed in these units are:

 the speed of light in vacuum, c,
 the gravitational constant, G,
 the reduced Planck constant, ħ, and
 the Boltzmann constant, kB.

Planck units do not incorporate an electromagnetic dimension. Some authors choose to extend the system to electromagnetism by, for example, adding either the Coulomb constant (k = ) or the electric constant (ε) to this list. Similarly, authors choose to use variants of the system that give other numeric values to one or more of the four constants above.

Introduction 
Any system of measurement may be assigned a mutually independent set of base quantities and associated base units, from which all other quantities and units may be derived. In the International System of Units, for example, the SI base quantities include length with the associated unit of the metre. In the system of Planck units, a similar set of base quantities and associated units may be selected, in terms of which other quantities and coherent units may be expressed. The Planck unit of length has become known as the Planck length, and the Planck unit of time is known as the Planck time, but this nomenclature has not been established as extending to all quantities.

All Planck units are derived from the dimensional universal physical constants that define the system, and in a convention in which these units are omitted (i.e. treated as having the dimensionless value 1), these constants are then eliminated from equations of physics in which they appear. For example, Newton's law of universal gravitation,

can be expressed as:

Both equations are dimensionally consistent and equally valid in any system of quantities, but the second equation, with G absent, is relating only dimensionless quantities since any ratio of two like-dimensioned quantities is a dimensionless quantity. If, by a shorthand convention, it is understood that each physical quantity is the corresponding ratio with a coherent Planck unit (or "expressed in Planck units"), the ratios above may be expressed simply with the symbols of physical quantity, without being scaled explicitly by their corresponding unit:

This may seem to be "setting the constants c, G, etc., to 1" if the correspondence of the quantities is thought of as equality. For this reason, Planck or other natural units should be employed with care. Referring to "", Paul S. Wesson wrote that, "Mathematically it is an acceptable trick which saves labour. Physically it represents a loss of information and can lead to confusion."

History and definition 
The concept of natural units was introduced in 1874, when George Johnstone Stoney, noting that electric charge is quantized, derived units of length, time, and mass, now named Stoney units in his honor. Stoney chose his units so that G, c, and the electron charge e would be numerically equal to 1. In 1899, one year before the advent of quantum theory, Max Planck introduced what became later known as the Planck constant. At the end of the paper, he proposed the base units that were later named in his honor. The Planck units are based on the quantum of action, now usually known as the Planck constant, which appeared in the Wien approximation for black-body radiation. Planck underlined the universality of the new unit system, writing:

Unlike the case with the International System of Units, there is no official entity that establishes a definition of a Planck unit system. Some authors define the base Planck units to be those of mass, length and time, regarding an additional unit for temperature to be redundant. Other tabulations add, in addition to a unit for temperature, a unit for electric charge, so that either the Coulomb constant  or the vacuum permittivity  is normalized to 1. Thus, depending on the author's choice, this charge unit is given by

Some of these tabulations also replace mass with energy when doing so.

The Planck charge, as well as other electromagnetic units that can be defined like resistance and magnetic flux, are more difficult to interpret than Planck's original units and are used less frequently.

Compared to Stoney units, Planck base units are all  times larger.

Derived units 
In any system of measurement, units for many physical quantities can be derived from base units. Table 2 offers a sample of derived Planck units, some of which are seldom used. As with the base units, their use is mostly confined to theoretical physics because most of them are too large or too small for empirical or practical use and there are large uncertainties in their values.

Some Planck units, such as of time and length, are many orders of magnitude too large or too small to be of practical use, so that Planck units as a system are typically only relevant to theoretical physics. In some cases, a Planck unit may suggest a limit to a range of a physical quantity where present-day theories of physics apply. For example, our understanding of the Big Bang does not extend to the Planck epoch, i.e., when the universe was less than one Planck time old. Describing the universe during the Planck epoch requires a theory of quantum gravity that would incorporate quantum effects into general relativity. Such a theory does not yet exist.

Several quantities are not "extreme" in magnitude, such as the Planck mass, which is about 22 micrograms: very large in comparison with subatomic particles, and within the mass range of living organisms. Similarly, the related units of energy and of momentum are in the range of some everyday phenomena.

Significance 
Planck units have little anthropocentric arbitrariness, but do still involve some arbitrary choices in terms of the defining constants. Unlike the metre and second, which exist as base units in the SI system for historical reasons, the Planck length and Planck time are conceptually linked at a fundamental physical level. Consequently, natural units help physicists to reframe questions. Frank Wilczek puts it succinctly:

While it is true that the electrostatic repulsive force between two protons (alone in free space) greatly exceeds the gravitational attractive force between the same two protons, this is not about the relative strengths of the two fundamental forces. From the point of view of Planck units, this is comparing apples with oranges, because mass and electric charge are incommensurable quantities. Rather, the disparity of magnitude of force is a manifestation of the fact that the charge on the protons is approximately the unit charge but the mass of the protons is far less than the unit mass.

Planck scale 
At this scale, present descriptions and theories of sub-atomic particle interactions in terms of quantum field theory break down and become inadequate, due to the impact of the apparent non-renormalizability of gravity within current theories.

Relationship to gravity 
At the Planck length scale, the strength of gravity is expected to become comparable with the other forces, and it has been theorized that all the fundamental forces are unified at that scale, but the exact mechanism of this unification remains unknown. The Planck scale is therefore the point at which the effects of quantum gravity can no longer be ignored in other fundamental interactions, where current calculations and approaches begin to break down, and a means to take account of its impact is necessary. On these grounds, it has been speculated that it may be an approximate lower limit at which a black hole could be formed by collapse.

While physicists have a fairly good understanding of the other fundamental interactions of forces on the quantum level, gravity is problematic, and cannot be integrated with quantum mechanics at very high energies using the usual framework of quantum field theory. At lesser energy levels it is usually ignored, while for energies approaching or exceeding the Planck scale, a new theory of quantum gravity is necessary. Approaches to this problem include string theory and M-theory, loop quantum gravity, noncommutative geometry, and causal set theory.

In cosmology 

In Big Bang cosmology, the Planck epoch or Planck era is the earliest stage of the Big Bang, before the time passed was equal to the Planck time, tP, or approximately 10−43 seconds. There is no currently available physical theory to describe such short times, and it is not clear in what sense the concept of time is meaningful for values smaller than the Planck time. It is generally assumed that quantum effects of gravity dominate physical interactions at this time scale. At this scale, the unified force of the Standard Model is assumed to be unified with gravitation. Immeasurably hot and dense, the state of the Planck epoch was succeeded by the grand unification epoch, where gravitation is separated from the unified force of the Standard Model, in turn followed by the inflationary epoch, which ended after about 10−32 seconds (or about 1011 tP).

Table 3 lists properties of the observable universe today expressed in Planck units.

After the measurement of the cosmological constant (Λ) in 1998, estimated at 10−122 in Planck units, it was noted that this is suggestively close to the reciprocal of the age of the universe (T) squared. Barrow and Shaw proposed a modified theory in which Λ is a field evolving in such a way that its value remains Λ ~ T−2 throughout the history of the universe.

Analysis of the units

Planck length 
The Planck length, denoted , is a unit of length defined as:

It is equal to  where the two digits enclosed by parentheses are the estimated standard error associated with the reported numerical value, or about  times the diameter of a proton. It can be motivated in various ways, such as considering a particle whose reduced Compton wavelength is comparable to its Schwarzschild radius, though whether those concepts are in fact simultaneously applicable is open to debate. (The same heuristic argument simultaneously motivates the Planck mass.)

The Planck length is a distance scale of interest in speculations about quantum gravity. The Bekenstein–Hawking entropy of a black hole is one-fourth the area of its event horizon in units of Planck length squared. Since the 1950s, it has been conjectured that quantum fluctuations of the spacetime metric might make the familiar notion of distance inapplicable below the Planck length. This is sometimes expressed by saying that "spacetime becomes a foam at the Planck scale". It is possible that the Planck length is the shortest physically measurable distance, since any attempt to investigate the possible existence of shorter distances, by performing higher-energy collisions, would result in black hole production. Higher-energy collisions, rather than splitting matter into finer pieces, would simply produce bigger black holes.

The strings of string theory are modeled to be on the order of the Planck length. In theories with large extra dimensions, the Planck length calculated from the observed value of  can be smaller than the true, fundamental Planck length.

Planck time
No current physical theory can describe timescales shorter than the Planck time, such as the earliest events after the Big Bang. Some conjecture that the structure of time need not remain smooth on intervals comparable to the Planck time.

Planck energy 
The Planck energy EP is approximately equal to the energy released in the combustion of the fuel in an automobile fuel tank (57.2 L at 34.2 MJ/L of chemical energy).

Proposals for theories of doubly special relativity posit that, in addition to the speed of light, an energy scale is also invariant for all inertial observers. Typically, this energy scale is chosen to be the Planck energy.

Planck unit of force 
The Planck unit of force may be thought of as the derived unit of force in the Planck system if the Planck units of time, length, and mass are considered to be base units.

It is the gravitational attractive force of two bodies of 1 Planck mass each that are held 1 Planck length apart. One convention for the Planck charge is to choose it so that the electrostatic repulsion of two objects with Planck charge and mass that are held 1 Planck length apart balances the Newtonian attraction between them.

Some authors have argued that the Planck force is on the order of the maximum force that can occur between two bodies. However, the validity of these conjectures has been disputed.

Planck temperature 
The Planck temperature TP is  At this temperature, the wavelength of light emitted by thermal radiation reaches the Planck length. There are no known physical models able to describe temperatures greater than TP; a quantum theory of gravity would be required to model the extreme energies attained. Hypothetically, a system in thermal equilibrium at the Planck temperature might contain Planck-scale black holes, constantly being formed from thermal radiation and decaying via Hawking evaporation. Adding energy to such a system might decrease its temperature by creating larger black holes, whose Hawking temperature is lower.

Nondimensionalized equations 
Physical quantities that have different dimensions (such as time and length) cannot be equated even if they are numerically equal (e.g., 1 second is not the same as 1 metre). In theoretical physics, however, this scruple may be set aside, by a process called nondimensionalization. The effective result is that many fundamental equations of physics, which often include some of the constants used to define Planck units, become equations where these constants are replaced by a 1.

Examples include the energy–momentum relation , which becomes , and the Dirac equation , which becomes .

Alternative choices of normalization 

As already stated above, Planck units are derived by "normalizing" the numerical values of certain fundamental constants to 1. These normalizations are neither the only ones possible nor necessarily the best. Moreover, the choice of what factors to normalize, among the factors appearing in the fundamental equations of physics, is not evident, and the values of the Planck units are sensitive to this choice.

The factor 4 is ubiquitous in theoretical physics because in three-dimensional space, the surface area of a sphere of radius r is 4r. This, along with the concept of flux, are the basis for the inverse-square law, Gauss's law, and the divergence operator applied to flux density. For example, gravitational and electrostatic fields produced by point objects have spherical symmetry, and so the electric flux through a sphere of radius r around a point charge will be distributed uniformly over that sphere. From this, it follows that a factor of 4r will appear in the denominator of Coulomb's law in rationalized form. (Both the numerical factor and the power of the dependence on r would change if space were higher-dimensional; the correct expressions can be deduced from the geometry of higher-dimensional spheres.) Likewise for Newton's law of universal gravitation: a factor of 4 naturally appears in Poisson's equation when relating the gravitational potential to the distribution of matter.

Hence a substantial body of physical theory developed since Planck's 1899 paper suggests normalizing not G but 4G (or 8G) to 1. When this is applied to electromagnetic constants, ε0, this unit system is called "rationalized. When applied additionally to gravitation and Planck units, these are called rationalized Planck units and are seen in high-energy physics.

The rationalized Planck units are defined so that .

There are several possible alternative normalizations.

Gravitational constant 
In 1899, Newton's law of universal gravitation was still seen as exact, rather than as a convenient approximation holding for "small" velocities and masses (the approximate nature of Newton's law was shown following the development of general relativity in 1915). Hence Planck normalized to 1 the gravitational constant G in Newton's law. In theories emerging after 1899, G nearly always appears in formulae multiplied by 4 or a small integer multiple thereof. Hence, a choice to be made when designing a system of natural units is which, if any, instances of 4 appearing in the equations of physics are to be eliminated via the normalization.
 Normalizing 4G to 1 (and therefore setting ):
 Eliminates 4G from the Poisson equation.
 Eliminates 4G in the gravitoelectromagnetic (GEM) equations, which hold in weak gravitational fields or locally flat spacetime. These equations have the same form as Maxwell's equations (and the Lorentz force equation) of electromagnetism, with mass density replacing charge density, and with  replacing ε0.
 Normalizes the characteristic impedance Zg of gravitational radiation in free space to 1 (normally expressed as ).
 Setting  (and therefore setting G = ). This would eliminate 8G from the Einstein field equations, Einstein–Hilbert action, and the Friedmann equations, for gravitation.

See also 
 cGh physics
 Dimensional analysis
 Doubly special relativity
 Trans-Planckian problem
 Zero-point energy

Explanatory notes

References

External links 
 Value of the fundamental constants, including the Planck units, as reported by the National Institute of Standards and Technology (NIST).
 The Planck scale: relativity meets quantum mechanics meets gravity from 'Einstein Light' at UNSW

Natural units
Max Planck
Quantum gravity